Didi Beck is a German electric bass and double bass player. He plays in the rockabilly band, the Boppin'B. An accomplished upright bass slap bass player, he teaches slap bass and has written an instruction book on slapping, and a made a video entitled How to Learn the Rockabilly Slap Bass Starring Didi Beck. His rapid, virtuosic slapping technique can be heard online.

References

External links
Boppin'B website

Year of birth missing (living people)
Living people
German double-bassists
Slap bassists (double bass)
21st-century double-bassists